United States v. Josef Perez, 22 U.S. (9 Wheat) 579 (1824), is a case of the Supreme Court of the United States. The decision held that when a criminal trial results in a hung jury, the Double Jeopardy Clause of the Fifth Amendment does not prevent the defendant from being retried.

Background of the case
Josef Perez (born in 1800) was tried in 1822 for piracy—at that time a capital offense. Perez had been accused of boarding and robbing the schooner Bee as she was docked at San Juan de los Remedios, Cuba.

His trial originally resulted in a mistrial because the jury were unable to agree on a verdict.  The judge dismissed the jury, and Perez' attorney claimed that Perez should be discharged since he had been tried once and not convicted.

The decision
The Supreme Court held that courts should be cautious and exercise sound discretion in discharging a jury prior to a verdict.  However, doing so does not bar retrial for the same offense.  The Supreme Court declined to order Perez released from custody, and declared it fit to retry him on the original indictment.

See also
 List of United States Supreme Court cases, volume 22

References

External links
 
 

1824 in United States case law
United States Supreme Court cases
United States Double Jeopardy Clause case law
Criminal cases in the Marshall Court
United States Supreme Court cases of the Marshall Court